Shiraz Naval Minwalla (born January 2, 1972) is an Indian theoretical physicist and string theorist. He is a faculty member in the Department of Theoretical Physics at Tata Institute of Fundamental Research, Mumbai. Prior to his present position, Minwalla was a Harvard Junior Fellow and subsequently an assistant professor at Harvard University.

Early life
Born in Mumbai, Maharashtra, India, in 1972, to a Parsi-Zoroastrian father (Naval) and a Muslim mother (Khadija), Minwalla graduated from Campion School, Mumbai in 1988 and then Indian Institute of Technology Kanpur in 1995. He later moved to Princeton University to earn his PhD under the guidance of Nathan Seiberg.

Awards
Minwalla was awarded the Swarnajayanti Fellowship 2005-06 by the Department of Science & Technology, Government of India. He was awarded the ICTP Prize in 2010 and the Shanti Swarup Bhatnagar Prize for Science and Technology, the highest science award in India, in the physical sciences category in 2011.
He was awarded the Infosys Prize 2013 in the field of Physical Sciences by the Infosys Science Foundation. Minwalla was awarded the 2014 New Horizons in Physics Prize by the Fundamental Physics Prize for "his pioneering contributions to the study of string theory and quantum field theory; and in particular his work on the connection between the equations of fluid dynamics and Albert Einstein's equations of general relativity." In 2016, The World Academy of Sciences awarded him the TWAS Prize in Physics.

Notable contributions to the field
 Analysis of primary operators on AdS4 and AdS7
 Three-point functions in N=4 supersymmetric Yang–Mills theory and AdS/CFT
 Noncommutative perturbative dynamics (with Nathan Seiberg and Mark Van Raamsdonk)
 Noncommutative solitons (with Andrew Strominger and Rajesh Gopakumar)
 OM-theory (with Nathan Seiberg, Andrew Strominger and Rajesh Gopakumar)
 Stringy interactions in pp-waves
 Some insights about tachyon condensation
 Dualities in supersymmetric gauge theories, in particular Chern-Simons-matter theories
 Fluid-Gravity correspondence, the connections between hydrodynamics and AdS/CFT.(with Sayantani Bhattacharyya)

Personal life
Shiraz Minwalla lives in Mumbai with his wife and two children.

Selected works

References

External links

Shiraz Minwalla's articles in the INSPIRE-HEP database

21st-century Indian physicists
Indian string theorists
Princeton University alumni
Harvard University faculty
IIT Kanpur alumni
Living people
Indian theoretical physicists
Academic staff of Tata Institute of Fundamental Research
Scientists from Mumbai
TWAS laureates
Parsi people from Mumbai
Parsi people
1972 births